The 2012 United States House of Representatives elections in Nevada were held on Tuesday, November 6, 2012 and elected the four U.S. Representatives from Nevada, one from each of the state's four congressional districts, an increase of one seat in reapportionment following the 2010 United States Census. Representatives are elected for two-year terms; those elected will serve in the 112th Congress from January 2013 until January 2015. The elections coincided with the elections of other federal and state offices, including a quadrennial presidential election, and an election to the U.S. Senate. Primary elections were held on June 12, 2012.

Overview

District 1
Democrat Shelley Berkley, who had represented Nevada's 1st congressional district since 1999, ran for the U.S. Senate.

Democratic primary

Candidates

Nominee
Dina Titus, former U.S. Representative for the 3rd district

Withdrawn
Ruben Kihuen, state senator

Declined
Shelley Berkley, incumbent U.S. Representative

Republican primary

Candidates

Nominee
Chris Edwards, security strategic planner and Navy officer

Eliminated in primary
Charmaine Guss, former real estate broker and anti-abortion activist
Brian Landsberger, retired mechanical engineer and former Air Force fighter pilot
Herb Peters, retired aerospace engineer and seven-time Libertarian candidate for Congress in California
Miguel "Mike" Rodrigues, elementary school principal

Primary results

Libertarian primary
Bill Pojunis ran as the nominee of the Libertarian Party of Nevada.

Independent American primary
Stan Vaughan ran as the nominee of the Independent American Party of Nevada.

General election

Endorsements

Results

District 2
Republican Mark Amodei, who has represented Nevada's 2nd congressional district since being elected in a special election in September 2011, is running for re-election.

Republican primary

Candidates

Nominee
Mark Amodei, incumbent U.S. Representative

Declined
Sharron Angle, former state assemblywoman and nominee for Senate in 2010

Democratic primary

Candidates

Nominee
Samuel Koepnick, information technology employee for the state

Eliminated in primary
Sam Dehne, retired pilot
Xiomara Rodriguez, retired businesswoman

Primary results

Independent American primary
Russell Best, a real estate broker and Navy veteran, ran as the nominee of the Independent American Party of Nevada.

General election

Endorsements

Results

District 3
Republican Joe Heck, who has represented Nevada's 3rd congressional district since January 2011, is running for re-election.

Republican primary

Candidates

Nominee
Joe Heck, incumbent U.S. Representative

Eliminated in primary
Chris Dyer, food service employee and Army and Navy veteran

Primary results

Democratic primary

Candidates

Nominee
John Oceguera, Speaker of the Nevada Assembly

Eliminated in primary
Stephen Frye, psychiatrist
James F. Haning II, businessman
Jesse "Jake" Holder, former Navy officer and Political Science student at UNLV
Barry Michaels, businessman
Gerald "Jerry" Sakura, retired business executive.

Declined
Dina Titus, former U.S. Representative

Primary results

Independent American primary
Tom Jones, a retired businessman, is running as the nominee of the Independent American Party of Nevada.

Independents
James Murphy, a retired airline captain, is running as an Independent.

General election

Endorsements

Debates
Complete video of debate' C-SPAN, October 11, 2012

Polling

Predictions

Results

District 4
Nevada's 4th congressional district was created for the 2012 elections as a result of reapportionment following the 2010 United States Census. It consists of most of Central Nevada and Northern Clark County, the latter of which contains the bulk of the district's population.

Democratic primary

Candidates

Nominee
Steven Horsford, majority leader of the Nevada Senate

Withdrawn
John Lee, state senator

Republican primary

Candidates

Nominee
Danny Tarkanian, businessman and candidate for Senate in 2010

Eliminated in primary
Diana Anderson, retired clerical worker
Barbara Cegavske, state senator 
Mike Delarosa, detention officer
Kiran Hill, translator for the State Department
Robert Leeds, author and former Merchant Marine
Dan Schwartz, businessman
Kenneth Wegner, retired Army veteran and nominee for the 1st district in 2006, 2008 and 2010
Sid Zeller, retired Marine intelligence officer

Primary results

Libertarian primary
Joseph Silvestri, a teacher and chairman of the Libertarian Party of Nevada, also ran.

Independent American primary
Floyd Fitzgibbons, an insurance agent, ran as the nominee of the Independent American Party of Nevada.

General election

Endorsements

Debates
Complete video of debate' C-SPAN, October 11, 2012

Polling

Predictions

Results

References

External links
Election Center at the Nevada Secretary of State
United States House of Representatives elections in Nevada, 2012 at Ballotpedia
Nevada U.S. House from OurCampaigns.com
Campaign contributions for U.S. Congressional races in Nevada from OpenSecrets
Outside spending at the Sunlight Foundation

2012 Nevada elections
Nevada
2012